Events in the year 1946 in Taiwan, Republic of China.

Incumbents

Events

May
 1 May - Taiwan Provincial Consultative Council was established.

December
 5 December – Hsinhua earthquake

Births
 7 April - Chan Wa-yen, flyweight athlete
 16 June - Ang Ui-jin, linguist

References 

 
Years of the 20th century in Taiwan